Bijapur is a town in Bijapur district, Chhattisgarh, India. It is the seat of the district and one of the 4 taluks in Bijapur district. The Bijapur taluk has an area of 928 km2 and 60,055 inhabitants (2001 census). It is situated on the National Highway 16 which connects Nizamabad in Telangana with Jagdalpur in southeastern Chhattisgarh.

References

Cities and towns in Bijapur district, Chhattisgarh